Pissonotus is a genus of delphacid planthoppers in the family Delphacidae. There are at least 40 described species in Pissonotus.

Species

 Pissonotus abdominalis (Crawford, 1914)
 Pissonotus absenta Caldwell in Caldwell and Martorell, 1951
 Pissonotus agrestis Morgan and Beamer, 1949
 Pissonotus albivultus Morgan & Beamer, 1949
 Pissonotus albovenosus Osborn, 1935
 Pissonotus aphidioides Van Duzee, 1897
 Pissonotus aquilonius Morgan and Beamer, 1949
 Pissonotus basalis Van Duzee, 1897
 Pissonotus binotatus Spooner, 1912
 Pissonotus boliviensis Bartlett in Bartlett and Dietz, 2000
 Pissonotus brevistilus Bartlett in Bartlett and Dietz, 2000
 Pissonotus brunneus Van Duzee, 1897
 Pissonotus canadensis Bartlett in Bartlett and Dietz, 2000
 Pissonotus concolor Bartlett in Bartlett and Dietz, 2000
 Pissonotus decussatus Bartlett in Bartlett and Dietz, 2000
 Pissonotus delicatus Van Duzee, 1897
 Pissonotus dentatus Morgan and Beamer, 1949
 Pissonotus divergens Bartlett in Bartlett and Dietz, 2000
 Pissonotus dorsalis Van Duzee, 1897
 Pissonotus festucae Bartlett in Bartlett and Dietz, 2000
 Pissonotus flabellatus (Ball, 1903)
 Pissonotus frontalis (Crawford, 1914)
 Pissonotus guttatus Spooner, 1912
 Pissonotus haywardi Muir, 1929
 Pissonotus jamaicensis Bartlett in Bartlett and Dietz, 2000
 Pissonotus lactofascius Morgan and Beamer, 1949
 Pissonotus marginatus Van Duzee, 1897
 Pissonotus melanurus Van Duzee, 1917
 Pissonotus merides Morgan and Beamer, 1949
 Pissonotus minutus Beamer, 1952
 Pissonotus muiri Metcalf, 1943
 Pissonotus neotropicus (Muir, 1926)
 Pissonotus niger Morgan & Beamer, 1949
 Pissonotus nigriculus Morgan and Beamer, 1949
 Pissonotus nigridorsum Metcalf, 1923
 Pissonotus nitens (Van Duzee, 1909)
 Pissonotus paludosus Morgan and Beamer, 1949
 Pissonotus paraguayensis Bartlett in Bartlett and Dietz, 2000
 Pissonotus piceus (Van Duzee, 1894)
 Pissonotus quadripustulatus (Van Duzee, 1909)
 Pissonotus radiolus Bartlett in Bartlett and Dietz, 2000
 Pissonotus rubrilatus Morgan and Beamer, 1949
 Pissonotus spatulatus Bartlett in Bartlett and Dietz, 2000
 Pissonotus spooneri Morgan and Beamer, 1949
 Pissonotus substitua (Walker, 1851)
 Pissonotus tessellatus (Ball, 1926)
 Pissonotus tumidus Morgan & Beamer, 1949

References

 Bartlett C, Adams E, Gonzon A (2011). "Planthoppers of Delaware (Hemiptera, Fulgoroidea), excluding Delphacidae, with species Incidence from adjacent States". ZooKeys 83: 1-42.
 Bartlett, Charles R., and Lewis L. Deitz (2000). "Revision of the New World Delphacid Planthopper Genus Pissonotus (Hemiptera: Fulgoroidea)". Thomas Say Publications in Entomology: Monographs, vi + 234.
 Metcalf, Z. P. (1943). General Catalogue of the Hemiptera, Fascicle IV: Fulgoroidea, Part 3: Araeopidae (Delphacidae), 552.
 Morgan, L. W., and R. H. Beamer (1949). "A revision of three genera of delphacine fulgorids from America north of Mexico". Journal of the Kansas Entomological Society, vol. 22, no. 3-4, 97-142.
 Van Duzee, E. P. (1897). "A Preliminary Review of the North American Delphacidae". Bulletin of the Buffalo Society of Natural Sciences, vol. 5, no. 5, 225-261.
 Wilson, S. W., and J. H. Tsai (1991). "Descriptions of nymphs of the delphacid planthopper Pissonotus delicatus (Homoptera: Fulgoroidea)". Journal of the New York Entomological Society, vol. 99, no. 2, 242-247.

Further reading

 Arnett, Ross H. (2000). American Insects: A Handbook of the Insects of America North of Mexico. CRC Press.

Auchenorrhyncha genera
Delphacini